Most of Sweden has a temperate climate, despite its northern latitude, with largely four distinct seasons and mild temperatures throughout the year. The winter in the far south is usually weak and is manifested only through some shorter periods with snow and sub-zero temperatures, autumn may well turn into spring there, without a distinct period of winter. The northern parts of the country have a subarctic climate while the central parts have a humid continental climate. The coastal south can be defined as having either a humid continental climate using the 0 °C isotherm, or an oceanic climate using the –3 °C isotherm.

Overview
This grows further when comparing areas in the northern interior where the winter difference in the far north is about  throughout the country. The warmest summers usually happen in the Mälaren Valley around Stockholm due to the vast landmass shielding the middle east coast from Atlantic low-pressure systems in July compared to the south and west. The colder temperatures are influenced by the higher elevation in the northern interior. As a result of the mild summers, the arctic region of Norrbotten has some of the northernmost agriculture in the world.

Sweden is much warmer and drier than other places at a similar latitude, and even somewhat farther south, mainly because of the combination of the Gulf Stream and the general west wind drift, caused by the direction of planet Earth's rotation. Continental west-coasts (to which all of Scandinavia belongs, as the westernmost part of the Eurasian continent), are notably warmer than continental east-coasts; this can also be seen by comparing e.g. the Canadian cities of Vancouver and Halifax, Nova Scotia with each other, the winter in west coast Vancouver is much milder; also, for example, central and southern Sweden has much milder winters than many parts of Russia, Canada, and the northern United States. Because of Sweden's high latitude, the length of daylight varies greatly. North of the Arctic Circle, the sun never sets for part of each summer, and it never rises for part of each winter. In the capital, Stockholm, daylight lasts for more than 18 hours in late June but only around 6 hours in late December. Sweden receives between 1,100 and 1,900 hours of sunshine annually.

Temperatures expected in Sweden are heavily influenced by the large Fennoscandian landmass, as well as continental Europe and western Russia, which allows hot or cool inland air to be easily transported to Sweden. That, in turn, renders most of Sweden's southern areas having warmer summers than almost everywhere in the nearby British Isles, even matching temperatures found along the continental Atlantic coast as far south as in northern Spain. In winter, however, the same high-pressure systems sometimes put the entire country far below freezing temperatures. There is some maritime moderation from the Atlantic which renders the Swedish continental climate less severe than that of nearby Russia. Even though temperature patterns differ between north and south, the summer climate is surprisingly similar all through the entire country in spite of the large latitudinal differences. This is due to the south's being surrounded by a greater mass of water, with the wider Baltic Sea and the Atlantic air passing over lowland areas from the south-west.

Apart from the ice-free Atlantic bringing marine air into Sweden tempering winters, the mildness is further explained by prevailing low-pressure systems postponing winter, with the long nights often staying above freezing in the south of the country due to the abundant cloud cover. By the time winter finally breaks through, daylight hours rise quickly, ensuring that daytime temperatures soar quickly in spring. With the greater number of clear nights, frosts remain commonplace quite far south as late as April. The cold winters occur when low-pressure systems are weaker. An example is that the coldest ever month (January 1987) in Stockholm was also the sunniest January month on record.

The relative strength of low and high-pressure systems of marine and continental air also define the highly variable summers. Nights normally remain cool, especially in inland areas. Coastal areas can see so-called tropical nights above  occur due to the moderating sea influence during warmer summers. Summers can be cool, especially in the north of the country. Transitional seasons are normally quite extensive and the four-season climate applies to most of Sweden's territory, except in Scania where some years do not record a meteorological winter (see table below) or in the high Lapland mountains where polar microclimates exist.

Extremes

Precipitation
Despite northerly locations, southern and central Sweden may have almost no snow in some winters. Most of Sweden is located in the rain shadow of the Scandinavian Mountains through Norway and north-west Sweden. The blocking of cool and wet air in summer, as well as the greater landmass, leads to warm and dry summers far north in the country, with quite warm summers at the Bothnia Bay coast at 65 degrees latitude, which is unheard of elsewhere in the world at such northerly coastlines.

Climate change

It is predicted that as the Barents Sea gets less frozen in the coming winters, becoming thus "Atlantified", additional evaporation will increase future snowfalls in Sweden and much of continental Europe.

Examples

Climate charts

Swedish Meteorological Institute, SMHI's monthly average temperatures of some of their weather stations – for the latest scientific full prefixed thirty-year period 1961–1990
Next will be presented in year 2020. The weather stations are sorted from south towards north by their numbers.

Table

See also
 Climate of Norway
 Geography of Sweden

References

Climate of Sweden